Lauren Anne Young (born November 8, 1993), simply known as Lauren Young, is a Filipino-American  actress, singer, and model. She is the younger sister of actress and Miss World 2013 Megan Young.

Biography

Career
Young was one of the 20 new talents introduced, as Star Magic Batch 13  by ABS-CBN's talent management agency Star Magic in 2006. Her acting debut was a cameo role in the Komiks episode Bampy—a Star Magic 14th Anniversary special. She then played Lea opposite Piolo Pascual in Star Magic Presents: All About A Girl. Young was one of the 19 newcomers introduced in the second season Star Magic Presents TV series, Abt Ur Luv.

Young appeared as Bernice in the commercially successful film, One More Chance in 2007. 

In 2008, she played the villainous Paige in Your Song Presents: Impossible. In 2009, she starred in another episode of Your Song Presents: Underage, opposite AJ Perez.

In 2010, she starred as Lorraine in the movie Sa 'Yo Lamang opposite Enchong Dee and appeared as Sunny-Rose Buenaventura, the younger sister of Rodjun Cruz in Juanita Banana.

In 2013, Lauren Young posed for Playboy and was the cover model for the November 2013 issue of Playboy.

Her breakthrough role was Via Pereira, originally played by Claudine Barretto, in ABS-CBN's 2011 remake of Mula Sa Puso.

Transfer to GMA Network
She transferred to GMA Network in 2012.

Her first project in GMA Network was Mundo Mo'y Akin with Alden Richards and Louise delos Reyes where she played the anti-hero role of Darlene Carbonel.

Lauren was also chosen to be the main protagonist of the teen drama suspense-thriller television series, Dormitoryo together with Enzo Pineda, Joyce Ching, Ruru Madrid and Wynwyn Marquez. She played the role of Hazel Mendoza, an inquisitive college student and her quest to know the truth behind the death of Maika Benitez (played by Wynwyn Marquez).

She also had her first mainstream film under GMA Films entitled Overtime, which she has been paired to Richard Gutierrez.

In 2015, Lauren played as one of the main antagonist in Marimar as Antonia Santibañez, who will make Marimar's life miserable which played by her real-life sister Megan Young. This marks their second project together after Star Magic Presents: Abt Ur Luv Ur Lyf 2.

Personal life
Lauren is the youngest daughter of Calvin and Victoria Young. She is a cousin of Max Collins.  She finished high school in Angelicum College and studied culinary arts in De La Salle–College of Saint Benilde.

Filmography

Television

Film

Notes

References

External links
 Lauren Young at GMANetwork.com
 
 Lauren Young at  Facebook.com

1993 births
Living people
De La Salle–College of Saint Benilde alumni
American film actresses
American actresses of Filipino descent
Filipino people of American descent
Filipino film actresses
Filipino television actresses
Filipino female models
Star Magic
ABS-CBN personalities
GMA Network personalities
Filipino television variety show hosts
Internet memes
Filipino game show hosts
21st-century American actresses
Filipino radio personalities
Female models from Virginia
Actresses from Alexandria, Virginia
People from Olongapo
Actresses from Zambales
21st-century Filipino singers
21st-century Filipino women singers